A Brighter Beat is the third studio album by Scottish singer-songwriter, Malcolm Middleton, released on 25 February 2007 on Full Time Hobby. The album is the first Middleton solo release since Arab Strap's split in 2006.

Overview
In 2006, after Arab Strap had split up after ten years together, Malcolm signed to Full Time Hobby and recorded A Brighter Beat. Malcolm has commented on the album, saying
 The album cover is a photograph by Scottish artist David Shrigley

Track listing

"A Brighter Beat", "Fuck It, I Love You", "Fight Like The Night" and "We're All Going To Die" were released as singles.

Personnel
Malcolm Middleton – guitar, bass guitar, vocals
Barry Burns – piano
Jenny Reeve – violin, vocals
Paul Savage – drums
Mick Cooke – brass
Tony Doogan – producer

Release history
A Brighter Beat was released in various countries in 2007.

References

2007 albums
Full Time Hobby albums
Malcolm Middleton albums